was a Japanese writer and poet. She won the Tanizaki Prize in 2011 for her memoir To the Peninsula (半島へ). Her short story  was translated into English by Lawrence Rogers for the collection Tokyo Stories: A Literary Stroll.

Biography 
Inaba was born in Aichi Prefecture in 1950. Her writing career began when she was 16 and won a poetry competition sponsored by the magazine Bungei Shunjū. She soon began writing fiction and won the Prize for Young Female Authors in 1973 for her short story . She was also awarded the Hirabayashi Taiko Prize for short story . Inaba's short story , named after a type of seaweed commonly known as dead man's fingers, won the 2007 Yasunari Kawabata Prize for best short story.

She died of pancreatic cancer at age 64.

References

1950 births
2014 deaths
Japanese writers
Recipients of the Medal with Purple Ribbon
Academic staff of Aichi Shukutoku University